St. Nicholas Montessori College, Ireland delivers courses in Montessori Teaching. Founded in 1978 by St. Nicholas Montessori Society of Ireland, in 1980 it purchased St. Nicholas House in Dun Laoghaire, and in 1984 the college commenced running training courses in Montessori education, initially a diploma awarded by the London Montessori Training Centre. In 1994 the college became accredited by National Council for Educational Awards (NCEA) and developed degree courses in Montessori education.
Currently  the college offers an undergraduate Level 7 Bachelor of Arts and a Level 8 BA (Hons) in Montessori Education, as well as a higher diploma, the qualifications are validated by the Irish Government's Quality & Qualifications Ireland (QQI). The college runs courses full-time and part-time, and from its Dublin and Cork locations. The current director of the college is Ian McKenna.

The full-time degrees and higher diplomas are available for application to via the Irish Government's CAO system, and the Higher Education Grants scheme (SUSI) is available to students.

References

Education in Dublin (city)
Further education colleges in Dublin (city)
Universities and colleges in the Republic of Ireland